Glypican-4 is a protein that in humans is encoded by the GPC4 gene.

Cell surface heparan sulfate proteoglycans are composed of a membrane-associated protein core substituted with a variable number of heparan sulfate chains. Members of the glypican-related integral membrane proteoglycan family (GRIPS) contain a core protein anchored to the cytoplasmic membrane via a glycosyl phosphatidylinositol linkage.  These proteins may play a role in the control of cell division and growth regulation.  The GPC4 gene is adjacent to the 3' end of GPC3 and may also play a role in Simpson-Golabi-Behmel syndrome.

See also 
 Glypican

References

Further reading

External links 
  GeneReviews/NIH/NCBI/UW entry on Simpson-Golabi-Behmel Syndrome